Nilsen is a surname of Norwegian origin, meaning "son of Nils". It refers to:

Adolf Nilsen (1895–1927), Norwegian Olympic rower
Alfred Nilsen (1892–1977), Norwegian politician; served one term in the Storting 1950–54
Alfred Sigurd Nilsen (1891–1977), Norwegian politician; served three terms in the Storting 
Anders Nilsen (disambiguation), several people
Arne Nilsen (1924–2020), Norwegian government minister
Achintya Holte Nilsen (born 1999) Indonesian-Norwegian model and activist
B. J. Nilsen (born 1975), Swedish sound artist
Betty Ann Bjerkreim Nilsen (born 1986), Norwegian orienteering competitor and cross country skier
Dennis Nilsen (1945–2018), British serial killer
Einar Nilsen (1901–1980), Norwegian Olympic boxer
Elin Nilsen (born 1968), Norwegian Olympic skier
Erling Nilsen (1910–1984), Norwegian Olympic boxer
Harald Christian Strand Nilsen (born 1971), Norwegian Olympic skier
Ida Nilsen (contemporary), Canadian singer and songwriter
Jeanette Nilsen (born 1972), Norwegian Olympic handball player
Jimmy Nilsen (born 1966), Swedish motorcycle speedway rider
Kristoffer Nilsen (1901–1975), Norwegian Olympic boxer
Kurt Nilsen (born 1978), Norwegian pop/country singer
Laila Schou Nilsen (1919–1998), Norwegian Olympic skater and skier
Lars Arvid Nilsen (born 1965), Norwegian shot putter
Lillebjørn Nilsen (born 1950), Norwegian singer, songwriter, and folk musician
Nils Emaus Nilsen (1886–1976), Norwegian politician; Served one term in the Storting 1950–54
Oddvard Nilsen (born 1940), Norwegian politician, served three terms in the Storting
Olav Nilsen (1942-2021), Norwegian professional football player
Ole-Jørgen Nilsen (1936–2008), Norwegian actor
Oliver John Nilsen (1884–1977), Australian businessman and Lord Mayor of Melbourne
Peder Nilsen (1846–1921), Norwegian government minister
Phil Nilsen (born 1985), English rugby union football player
Roger Nilsen (born 1969), Norwegian professional football player
Rudolf Nilsen (1901–1929), Norwegian poet and journalist
Rune Nilsen (1923–1998), Norwegian Olympic triple jumper
Selmer Nilsen (1931–1991), Norwegian fisherman who spied for KGB during the Cold War
Spencer Nilsen (born 1961), American video game music composer
Steinar Nilsen (born 1972), Norwegian professional football player and manager
Tom-Christer Nilsen (born 1969), Norwegian politician from Hordaland
Torstein Aagaard-Nilsen (born 1964), Norwegian music composer
Werner Nilsen (1904–1992), Norwegian-American soccer player

See also
Nilsson
Nelson

Norwegian-language surnames
Surnames from given names